John Kramer may refer to:

 John Kramer (darts player) (born 1956), retired American professional darts player
 John Kramer, better known as Jigsaw, fictional character in the Saw franchise
 John Kramer, bassist with the Arthur Lyman Group
 Jack Kramer (John Albert Kramer, 1921–2009), American tennis player
 John R. Kramer (1937–2006), former Tulane University Law School dean
 John H. Kramer, emeritus professor at Pennsylvania State University
 John Krämer, German writer
 John Kramer (footballer)

See also
John Cramer (disambiguation)